Pamela Chepchumba (born March 8, 1979 in Kapsait, West Pokot District) is an athlete from Kenya. Her best achievements are from cross country running.

Aged only 13, Chemchumba competed at the 1992 IAAF World Cross Country Championships, finishing 27th in the junior race. Still at junior level, she participated in the 1994 and 1995 edition of IAAF World Cross Country Championships, finishing 7th and 10th respectively. At the time she took a break in running to concentrate in schooling, where she was lagging. She went to Kapkenda Secondary School in 1997.

Pamela Chepchumba was suspended for two years after testing positive for EPO at the 2003 IAAF World Cross Country Championships held in Lausanne, Switzerland. She had finished sixth, but was disqualified. She returned in 2005 and won the Udine Half Marathon.

Her husband Boaz Kimaiyo is also a runner, as is her younger brother Nicholas Koech, who mainly competes in road races. She has two daughters (as of 2007). She is managed by Federico Rosa and coached by Eric Kimaiyo.

Achievements

More achievements 
2001 Heusden International, 5000 metres - 1st.
2001 Parelloop 10K - 1st 
2005 Udine Half Marathon, Italy - 1st 
2005 Nairobi Marathon - 3rd 
2006 Paris Marathon - 3rd 
2006 Beijing Marathon - 2nd (time 2:34:51) 
2006 Portugal Half Marathon - 1st 
2007 Azkoitia-Azpeitia Half Marathon - 1st 
2007 Milan Marathon - 1st (time 2:25:36, PB) 
2007 Philadelphia Distance Run (half marathon) - 1st 
2008 Ras Al Khaimah Half Marathon -2nd 
2008 Lisbon Half Marathon -2nd 
2008 Bogota Half Marathon -1st 
2008 Hamburg Marathon - 2nd (time 2:28:36) 
2008 Porto Half Marathon - 1st (time 1:10:26) 
2009 Tokyo Marathon - 9th
2009 Porto Half Marathon - 1st (time 1:10:24) 
2009 Honolulu Marathon - 3rd

See also
List of sportspeople sanctioned for doping offences

References 

Marathoninfo profile
Rosa & Associati profile

1979 births
Living people
Kenyan female long-distance runners
Doping cases in athletics
Kenyan sportspeople in doping cases
People from West Pokot County
Kenyan female cross country runners